The Peterborough Panthers are a British speedway team based in Peterborough, England. They are three times champions of the United Kingdom, winning the highest level league in 1999, 2006 and 2021.

History

1970–1994
The Panthers inaugural season was in the 1970 British League Division Two season in which they finished in 10th place. The team spent 25 consecutive seasons in Division 2 (British League Division 2 and the National League). Their best finish was winning the Division 2 title and Knockout Cup during the 1992 British League Division Two season.

1995–2013

The 1995 Premier League speedway season resulted in the merger of both divisions, meaning that the Panthers competed in the top division for the first time. The team dropped down a division in 1998, which brought immediate success, winning the 1998 Premier League speedway season. The following season they went up to the Elite League (Div 1) and completely rebuilt their team for the season. They brought in three Australians Jason Crump from Oxford Cheetahs, Ryan Sullivan from Poole Pirates and Craig Watson from Newport Wasps, in addition to recalling Zdeněk Tesař. Poole ran Peterborough pipped Poole by one point and beat them in the cup final to achieve the league and cup double.

Another Knockout Cup was added to the trophy cabinet in 2001 and the team won the title during the 2006 Elite League speedway season. Peterborough and Reading battled each other throughout the season finishing level on points in the regular season table before Peterborough edged Reading in the Play off final. Peterborough had a strong all round squad and included Danish trio of Hans Andersen, Jesper Jensen and Niels Kristian Iversen, in addition to Australian Ryan Sullivan. 

The team continued to compete in the highest league from 2007 to 2013, despite problems during the 2011 season. On 24 November 2010 following changes to the rules for rider averages made at the Annual General Meeting of the BSPA, the Peterborough Panthers and Coventry Bees walked out of the meeting. As a result the BSPA omitted both teams from the 2011 Elite League for failing to declare their intent to compete. The decision was the subject of a legal challenge by both clubs. The BSPA offered a compromise which was initially rejected until 8 April when both teams confirmed their starting places.

The team had a record Elite League victory on 23 August 2013, beating Coventry Bees by 70 points to 20 and in 2017 the Panthers won the SGB Championship Fours at their home track.

2014–2023
The Panthers competed in the second division from 2014 to 2018. They won the 2017 division 2 Knockout Cup during the period. In 2019, the team rejoined the highest league called the SGB Premiership. In 2021, they won the highest league title for just the third time in their history. After finishing top of the regular season table by just one point, they overtook the long time leaders Wolverhampton Wolves and by virtue of finishing top they elected to play Wolves in the play off semi finals, rather than the third or fourth placed teams Belle Vue and Sheffield. Peterborough then deservedly won the playoffs by beating Wolverhampton in the semifinals and Belle Vue in the final.

The 2023 season was the last season for Peterborough at the East of England Showground. The club will need to move after the season due to the redevelopment of the Arena by owners Asset Earning Power Group (AEPG).

Season summary

Season summary (juniors)

Riders previous seasons

2012 team

2013 team

2014 team

2015 team

2016 team

2017 team

2018 team

2019 team

2020 team

2021 team

2022 team & greensheet averages

 7.59
 6.86
 6.81
 (C) 5.28
 5.17
 4.93
 (Rising Star) 3.00
 (Number 8) 3.00
 3.00
 3.00

Honours 
Elite League
League Champions (2) – 1999, 2006, 2021.
Play Off’s (6) – 2002, 2003 2004, 2006, 2007 & 2010.
Knockout Cup Winners (2) – 1999 & 2001.
Knockout Cup Runners Up (1) - 2002.
Craven Shield Winners (1) – 1999.
Craven Shield Runners Up (1) – 2001.
Elite Shield Winners (1) – 2007.
Premiership Runners Up (1) – 1997.
4TT Champions (1) – 1997.
Midland League Runners Up (1) - 2009.
League Riders Champions (2) – J Crump 1999 & R Sullivan 2000.
British Champions (1) – M Loram 2001.
British U21 Champions (1) – D Howe 2000.

Premier League

League Champions (1) – 1998.
League Runners Up (1) – 1996.
KO Cup Runners Up (2) – 1996 & 1998.
Young Shield Runners Up (1) - 1998.
4TT Champions (1) - 1998.
4TT Runners Up (2) – 1995 & 1996.
League Riders Champion (2) – G Cunningham 1998; Ulrich Østergaard 2015.
Pairs Champions (1) – G Cunningham & B Woodifield 1998.

British League (Div 2) – Seasons (9)

League Champions (1) – 1992.
Ko Cup Winners (1) – 1992.
Ko Cup Runners Up (1) – 1972.
Premiership Winners (1) – 1993.
4TT Champions (1) – 1992.

National League – Seasons (16)

4TT Champions (4) – 1977, 1978, 1988, 1989.
Gold Cup Runners Up (1) – 1991.
League Riders Champion (1) – I Barney 1984.

Notable riders

References

External links 

Sport in Peterborough
Speedway Elite League teams
SGB Championship teams